Aluminum based nanogalvanic alloys refer to a class of nanostructured metal powders that spontaneously and rapidly produce oxygen and hydrogen gas upon contact with water or any liquid containing water. This method of hydrogen generation is notable in the field of energy research due to its fast-acting capacity to efficiently create hydrogen at room temperature without the need for any chemicals, catalysts, or externally supplied power.

Overview 
When aluminum makes contact with water, hydrogen gas is produced as a result of hydrolysis. However, at the same time, water oxidizes the aluminum and causes a thin protective layer of aluminum oxide to rapidly form on the surface of the metal, preventing further hydrolysis. In order for the aluminum to continuously produce hydrogen gas, scientists had to forcefully remove or at least fracture the aluminum oxide layer, typically dissolving it in water with the help of hazardous compounds such as hydrochloric acid, sodium hydroxide, or expensive elements such as gallium/indium. Other methods apply external energy in the form of an electric current or superheated steam to slowly force the reaction at elevated temperatures. The aluminum based nanogalvanic alloy, a particulate material invented by the U.S. Army Research Laboratory (ARL), is able to generate hydrogen by hydrolysis at room temperature with any liquid that contains water (e.g. naturally scavenged water, coffee, energy drinks, urine, etc.) without relying on any other chemicals, catalysts, or externally supplied power. The nanostructured galvanic couple, with aluminum as the anode and another element (e.g. tin, bismuth, etc.) as the cathode, rapidly disturbs the formation of the native oxide layer and thus continually exposes fresh aluminum surfaces to hydrolysis.

Development 
Aluminum based nanogalvanic alloys were initially discovered by researchers of the Metals Branch of ARL's Weapons and Materials Research Directorate (WMRD) while they were testing a new nanostructured aluminum alloy intended for structural materials applications. During metallographic polishing for microhardness experiments, they noticed that the aluminum was disappearing upon contact with water and soon realized that it was creating hydrogen gas in the process. The research team then decided to repurpose the alloy powder for energy applications. A patent was filed for the invention in June 2018 in order to license the aluminum powder to industry. In 2019, the hydrogen fuel company H2 Power, LLC was the first to receive an exclusive license to use the aluminum based nanogalvanic alloys to investigate automotive and transportation power generation applications for cars, trucks, motorcycles, and other vehicles. As of 2019, ARL researchers are looking for ways to improve the production and manufacturing process of the aluminum based nanogalvanic alloys.

Properties 
Aluminum based nanogalvanic alloys are characterized by the size of their galvanic microstructure and consist of particles with a mesh size of -325, which is equivalent to a diameter of around 50 microns. Since the grain size of the powders is in the nanometer scale and the particle size is tens of microns similar to conventional powders, no additional health hazards are associated with the handling of the nanogalvanic powders. The by-products of the powder reaction with water is non-toxic and occurs naturally. The aluminum based nanogalvanic alloys were also demonstrated to produce 1000 ml. of hydrogen gas per gram of aluminum in less than 1 minute and 1340 ml—100% of the theoretical yield at 295 K and 1 atm.—in 3 minutes without the need for hazardous or costly materials, or additional processes. These nanogalvanic structured powders can be manufactured by means of high energy ball milling at room temperature or at lower temperatures. The powders may be compacted in the form of tablets for ease of transportation, which would reduce reliance on high-pressure or liquid hydrogen cylinders traditionally used for shipment. Additionally, they are stable in the atmosphere at standard temperature, pressure, and humidity levels, allowing for convenient storage.

Applications 
One of the major potential applications of aluminum-based nanogalvanic alloys is hydrogen production for fuel cells. Due to their high energy efficiency, non-toxic nature, and transportation ease, the alloy powders have also been considered as an alternative energy source for batteries (when coupled with fuel cells) during reconnaissance for soldiers on the battlefield. Additionally, the alloy powder may also be 3D-printed into self-cannibalizing drone components that could recharge the drone's hydrogen supply by making contact with water whenever it runs low on power. ARL researchers also discovered that the hydrogen generation rate increases by almost two-fold when the aluminum based nanogalvanic alloy powder comes in contact with urine, when compared with pure water. Because of this unique property, scientists have considered applying the aluminum powder in austere environments where power and water are scarce, such as deserts or space, where urine could be repurposed as a fuel source.

References 

Hydrogen production
Environmental chemistry
Fuels